Guzmania longipetala is a species of flowering plant in Bromeliaceae family. It is native to Ecuador and Colombia.

References

longipetala
Flora of Colombia
Flora of Ecuador
Plants described in 1888
Taxa named by John Gilbert Baker
Taxa named by Carl Christian Mez